Beating the Game is a 1921 American silent Western film directed by Lee Kohlmar and featuring Hoot Gibson.

Cast
 Hoot Gibson
 Marcella Pershing
 Harry Archer
 W. Stuart McCrea credited as Walter McCrea

See also
 List of American films of 1921
 Hoot Gibson filmography

External links
 

1921 films
1921 short films
1921 Western (genre) films
American silent short films
American black-and-white films
Films directed by Lee Kohlmar
Silent American Western (genre) films
1920s American films